Ronald Chow Mei-tak (born 1951) was the member of the Legislative Council of Hong Kong for Health functional constituency.

Chow graduated from the University of Hong Kong, with a bachelor's degree in Social Sciences. He also got a diploma in health administration. He became a registered nurse in Hong Kong and a state registered nurse in the United Kingdom. He was also an organizer for the AIA Group Limited.

He became one of the three Legislative Councillors of the United Democrats of Hong Kong, the first pro-democratic political party when it established in 1990. But he soon quit the party for the Hong Kong Association for Democracy and People's Livelihood (ADPL). In the first Legislative Council direct election in 1991, he contested in the New Territories North constituency but was lost to Meeting Point's Tik Chi-yuen and United Democrats' Fung Chi-wood.

References

1951 births
Living people
Hong Kong nurses
Hong Kong Association for Democracy and People's Livelihood politicians
United Democrats of Hong Kong politicians
Alumni of the University of Hong Kong
HK LegCo Members 1988–1991